Simeon Galvez Toribio (September 3, 1905 – June 5, 1969) was a Filipino high jumper. He competed at the 1928, 1932 and 1936 Olympics and won a bronze medal in 1932. In 1928, he cleared the same height as the silver and bronze medalists Benjamin Hedges and Claude Ménard, but lost the jump-off and placed fourth. Toribio served as the flag bearer for the Philippines at the 1936 Games, where he finished 12th. In 1930 he was awarded the title "Asia’s Greatest Athlete".

Biography
According to author Jorge Afable, Toribio could have won the gold medal, if not only for the "call of nature". It was a grueling four-hour competition to jump over the bar raised at six feet and six inches high. Toribio, who once made the jump, failed to overcome it the second time because he was distressed by call of nature.

Toribio studied at Silliman University, and later became a civil engineer. In 1941, he was elected to the House of Representatives of the Philippines, representing the Second District of Bohol, and served until 1953. He settled in Carmen, Bohol and died there in 1969. His descendants are currently continuing his legacy in Public Service.

References

External links
 

1905 births
1969 deaths
Athletes (track and field) at the 1928 Summer Olympics
Athletes (track and field) at the 1932 Summer Olympics
Athletes (track and field) at the 1936 Summer Olympics
Sportspeople from Zamboanga City
Sportspeople from Bohol
Boholano people
Filipino male high jumpers
Filipino civil engineers
Olympic track and field athletes of the Philippines
Olympic bronze medalists for the Philippines
Silliman University alumni
Members of the House of Representatives of the Philippines from Bohol
National Collegiate Athletic Association (Philippines) players
Filipino sportsperson-politicians
Medalists at the 1932 Summer Olympics
Olympic bronze medalists in athletics (track and field)
Members of the National Assembly of the Philippines
Philippine Sports Hall of Fame inductees